Vari-Voula-Vouliagmeni is a municipality in the East Attica regional unit of Attica, Greece. The seat of the municipality is Voula. The municipality has an area of 10,450 km2. The municipal unit has an area of 37,225 km2. It is part of Athens urban area, forming part of its southern suburbs and contains some of the area's most famous beaches and some of the most expensive real  estate in Greece.

Formation
The municipality was formed at the 2011 local government reform known as the Kallikratis Plan, by the merger of the following three municipalities that became municipal units:
Vari
Voula
Vouliagmeni

References

 
Municipalities of Attica
Populated places in East Attica